Secrets of the I Ching is the first album by American alternative rock band 10,000 Maniacs (following their 1982 EP, Human Conflict Number Five), released in 1983 by Mark Records. While the album also contained the band's own Christian Burial Music imprint, the label itself was fictitious.

Re-recorded versions of the songs "Tension" (as "Tension Makes a Tangle"), "Grey Victory", "Daktari" and "My Mother the War" would later appear on the band's 1985 album The Wishing Chair. The song "Tension" is itself a re-recording of a song that initially appeared on the band's Human Conflict Number Five EP.

All the tracks on the LP appear in remixed, remastered and resequenced form on the 10,000 Maniacs compilation CD Hope Chest: The Fredonia Recordings 1982-1983 (1990).

Background
Following the release of their debut EP, Human Conflict Number Five, 10,000 Maniacs embarked upon several months of touring independent clubs, including the Eastern seaboard, and achieved a greater following after receiving airplay on college radio. The band decided to return to the studio in the spring of 1983. Like Human Conflict Number Five before it, Secrets of the I Ching was recorded at State University of New York, Fredonia, and recording commenced the week of March 19, helmed by Albert Garzon, assisted by David Brick. Since the band were not students of the university, they were forced to conduct sessions only in the evening. The album is the first of their recordings with drummer Jerome Augustyniak.

Like Human Conflict Number Five, the album would bear the band's own fictitious Christian Burial Music imprint but was again manufactured by Mark Records out of Clarence, New York. 2,000 copies were pressed, once again funded by Dennis Drew's parents, but also aided by Natalie Merchant, Dan Lombardo, Frank Scuettle, Dan Deutsch and Mark Grosso. Also like their previous EP, the album was later reissued by Press Records in the US and UK, as well as Normal Records in Germany.

In addition to garnering college radio airplay in the U.S., BBC Radio 1 DJ John Peel began playing "My Mother the War" in the UK, which led the band to tour there in 1984.

Critical reception
Trouser Press wrote that the album "begins to bring some needed focus to the band’s warmly eccentric vision by concentrating on the folk-rock elements ... the music ranges from screeching noise layered over a pop hook to almost psychedelic power calypso." MusicHound Rock: The Essential Album Guide called the album "sonically anemic." The Spin Alternative Record Guide wrote that "it's fun to hear [the band] try their chops on the hip genres of the day."

Robert Christgau of The Village Voice said, "Not only does Natalie inflect the English language as if she grew up speaking some Polynesian tongue, but she writes lyrics to match, lyrics which from the crib sheet I'd adjudge the most sophomoric poetry-of-pretension to hit pop music since lysergic acid was in flower." In a 1994 interview with Q magazine, Merchant recalled this line from Christgau, saying, "I'll inform you that I was only 17 years old, so it made a big impression on me – that I'd written the most pretentious lyrics since lysergic acid had been in flower. I was upset then but now I laugh about it because I've put Robert Christgau in perspective."

Track listing
All lyrics by Natalie Merchant and music by John Lombardo, except where indicated.

Side one
"Grey Victory" (lyrics: Merchant; music: Lombardo, Rob Buck)
"Pour de Chirico"
"Death of Manolete"
"Tension"
"Daktari" (lyrics: Merchant, Lombardo; music: Lombardo)

Side two
"Pit Viper" (lyrics: Merchant; music: Steven Gustafson)
"Katrina's Fair" (lyrics: Merchant; music: Buck)
"The Latin One"
"National Education Week" (lyrics: Merchant; music: Dennis Drew)
"My Mother the War" (lyrics: Merchant, Michael Walsh; music: Lombardo)

The above track listing is for the original Mark Records pressing for Christian Burial Music, the band's own label. Subsequent editions of this album are missing "National Education Week".

Personnel 
10,000 Maniacs
Robert Buck – "principal guitars devices" (i.e., lead guitar, synthesizers)
Natalie Merchant – voice
Dennis Drew – organ, piano
Steven Gustafson – bass guitar (1, 2, 4–9), third guitar (3, 10)
Jerome Augustyniak – percussion
John Lombardo (as J.C. Lombardo) – second guitar (1, 2, 4–9), bass guitar (3, 10)

Technical
Albert Garzon – co-producer, engineer, mixing
10,000 Maniacs – co-producers
David Brick – mixing
Bob Grotke – mastering
Natalie Merchant – package
John Lombardo –  package
Gustav Doré – etching ("The Great Flood")

Subsequent releases omit Albert Garzon's name and credit David Brick with co-production and engineering.

References 

1983 debut albums